PNS Tariq (DDG-181) is the lead ship of the s in the Surface Command of the Pakistan Navy.

Designed and constructed by the Yarrow Shipbuilders, Ltd. at Glasgow in Scotland in 1975, she underwent an extensive modernization and mid-life upgrade program by the KSEW Ltd. at the Naval Base Karachi in 1998–2002.

Service history

Acquisition, construction, and modernization

She was lead ship based on the Type 21/Amazon design and was constructed by the Yarrow Shipbuilders, Ltd. in Glasgow in Scotland in 1973–75.

After the successful negotiations took place between Pakistan and the United Kingdom to procure the entire fleet of Type 21/Amazon frigates, she was decommissioned by the Royal Navy and a contingent of Pakistan Navy's personnel under Commander Muhammad Anwar arrived to receive training of her operations. She was commissioned in the services of Pakistan Navy on 28 July 1993 at the Port of Plymouth in England, reporting to its Naval Base Karachi on 18 November 1993.

She was namesake after Tariq ibn Ziyad, the commander who led the Umayyad conquest of Visigothic Hispania in 711–718 A.D.

The Royal Navy did not transfer either the Exocet and Seacat missiles, which were removed prior to arriving at Karachi but the Westland Lynx helicopters remained with the ship. The modernization of the ship was performed by KSEW Ltd which later installed the Phalanx system in place of the Seacat missiles as well as the Mk. 36 SRBOC launchers and 20 mm and 30 mm guns were fitted.

Her wartime performance included in deployments in patrolling off the Gulf of Aden, Gulf of Oman, Persian Gulf, Arabian Sea as well as deploying in the Mediterranean Sea when she was part of the multinational military exercise with the U.S. Navy in 2005.

Gallery

References

External links
 
 

1973 ships
Ships built in Pakistan
Tariq-class destroyers